Madison Ellis Marye (December 3, 1925 – February 23, 2016) was an American farmer and politician.

Born in Richmond, Virginia, Marye served in the United States Army during World War II, the Korean War, and the Vietnam War. He was a farmer and raised beef cattle in Shawsville, Virginia. Marye served in the Senate of Virginia, from 1973 to 2002, representing parts of southwest Virginia. He was a Democrat.

Marye was the son of Ambrose Madison Marye (1887-1972) and his wife, Leila MacLachlan (Ellis) Marye (1888-1968). His paternal 4th great-uncle was 4th President of the United States James Madison; his maternal great-grandfather was 10th President of the United States John Tyler.

References

External links
 
 
 

1925 births
2016 deaths
People from Shawsville, Virginia
Politicians from Richmond, Virginia
Farmers from Virginia
Democratic Party Virginia state senators
United States Army personnel of World War II
United States Army personnel of the Korean War
20th-century American politicians
United States Army soldiers
Military personnel from Virginia